Georg Marcgrave (originally , also spelled "Marcgraf" "Markgraf") (1610 – 1644) was a German naturalist and astronomer, whose posthumously published Historia Naturalis Brasiliae was a major contribution to early modern science.

Life 
Born in Liebstadt in the Electorate of Saxony, Marcgrave studied botany, astronomy, mathematics, and medicine in Germany and Switzerland until 1636 when he journeyed to Leiden in the Netherlands.

In 1637, he was appointed astronomer of a company being formed to sail to the Dutch Brazil. He was accompanied by Willem Piso, a physician. He afterward entered the service of Dutch Brazil's governor, Johan Maurits van Nassau-Siegen, whose patronage provided him with the means of exploring a considerable part of Brazil. He arrived in Brazil in early 1638 and undertook the first zoological, botanical, and astronomical expedition there, exploring various parts of the colony to study its natural history and geography. Traveling later to the coast of Guinea, he fell a victim to the climate.

Publications 
His large map of Brazil, an important event in cartography was published in 1647. According to Cuvier, Marcgrave was the most able and most precise of all those who described the natural history of remote countries during the sixteenth and seventeenth centuries.

He was the co-author (with Willem Piso) of Historia Naturalis Brasiliae, a single volume work on the botany and zoology of Brazil, that has had lasting influence in the history of science.

References

External links 

 Historia naturalis Brasiliae on Biodiversity Heritage Library

  Account of Piso and Marcgrave to promote sale of a digitalized version of Historia Naturalis Brasiliae.

Further reading 
 Darmstaedter, L. (1928) Georg Marcgrave und Wilhelm Piso, die ersten Erforscher Brasiliens, Velhagen Klasings Monatshefte. 1928. pp. 649–654.
 Holthuis, L.B. (1991) Marcgraf's (1648) Brazilian Crustacea Zoologische Verhandelingen, Vol. 268 p. 1-123 PDF
 Whitehead, P.J.P. (1979) "The biography of Georg Marcgraf (1610-1643/4) by his brother Christian, translated by James Petiver" in  J. Soc. Biblphy nat. Hist., 9:301-314.

1610 births
1644 deaths
People from Sächsische Schweiz-Osterzgebirge
People from the Electorate of Saxony
17th-century German astronomers
German naturalists
German expatriates in Brazil
Sailors on ships of the Dutch West India Company
German explorers
Explorers of South America
17th-century Dutch cartographers
People of Dutch Brazil